Zemiropsis rosadoi is a species of sea snail, a marine gastropod mollusk in the family Babyloniidae.

Description

Distribution
This species occurs in the Indian Ocean off of Mozambique.

References

 Bozzetti (1998). Malacologia (Mostra Mondiale) 27 : 27–31
 Gittenberger E. & Goud J. (2003) The genus Babylonia revisited (Mollusca: Gastropoda: Buccinidae). Zoologische Verhandelingen 345: 151–162 page(s): 161

External links
 

Babyloniidae
Gastropods described in 1998
Invertebrates of Mozambique